The 1982 Champion Spark Plug 400 was a NASCAR Winston Cup Series race held on August 22, 1982, at Michigan International Speedway in Brooklyn, Michigan.

Background
Groundbreaking took place on September 28, 1967. Over  of dirt were moved to form the D-shaped oval. The track opened in 1968 with a total capacity of 25,000 seats. The track was originally built and owned by Lawrence H. LoPatin, a Detroit-area land developer who built the speedway at an estimated cost of $4–6 million. Financing was arranged by Thomas W Itin. Its first race took place on Sunday, October 13, 1968, with the running of the USAC 250 mile Championship Car Race won by Ronnie Bucknum.

Summary
It took two hours and forty-five minutes to complete this event. 38 American-born drivers competed on this 200-lap event; Joe Ruttman would become the last-place finisher due to a problem with his vehicle's oil pump on the second lap. Bill Elliott would end up finishing the race 96 laps behind the leaders while Tim Richmond would see the conclusion of his racing weekend by inflicting some damage to the back of his car on lap 161. This was the debut race for the Chrysler Imperial car of Buddy Arrington.

Thirty thousand people watched Bobby Allison best Richard Petty by two car lengths. The final 50 laps would be monopolized by three different drivers (Richard Petty, Darrell Waltrip and Bobby Allison). Terry Labonte would lead in championship points after this race; trailing by 50 points to Bobby Allison. Ronnie Thomas and Al Loquasto did not qualify on time but were added to the field through what would come to be known as provisionals.

Tony Bettenhausen Jr. and Robin McCall would make their respective departures from the NASCAR Winston Cup Series after the conclusion of this event.

Notable crew chiefs to participate in the race were Buddy Parrott, Junie Donlavey, Joey Arrington, Elmo Langley, Darrell Bryant, Jake Elder, Travis Carter, Waddell Wilson, Tim Brewer, Bud Moore, Jeff Hammond, and Larry McReynolds.

Individual race earnings ranged from the winner's share of $26,900 ($ when adjusted for inflation) to the last-place finisher's share of $1,850 ($ when adjusted for inflation). $222,875 went to all the drivers of this event ($ when adjusted for inflation).

Qualifying

Results

Timeline
Section reference: 
 Start of race: Bill Elliott has the pole position to begin the race with.
 Lap 2: Joe Ruttman's oil pump became problematic, forcing him to become the last-place finisher.
 Lap 3: Caution for spun tire on turn three, green flag racing resumed on lap 6.
 Lap 7: Earle Canavan's engine stopped working properly.
 Lap 18: Al Loquasto had a terminal crash.
 Lap 21: Caution due to a five-car accident, green flag racing resumed on lap 26.
 Lap 42: H.B. Bailey could not handle his vehicle properly, forcing him to exit the race.
 Lap 45: Mark Martin lost the rear end of his vehicle.
 Lap 47: Robin McCall had a terminal crash.
 Lap 51: Caution due to Robin McCall's accident, green flag racing resumed on lap 26.
 Lap 68: The sway bar from Morgan Shepherd's vehicle came off, ending his race weekend early.
 Lap 75: David Pearson's oil pump stopped working properly.
 Lap 76: Dale Earnhardt's vehicle developed serious brake issues.
 Lap 84: Caution due to rain, green flag racing resumed on lap 92.
 Lap 96: Dave Simko's engine became more than a nuisance for him, causing him to leave the race.
 Lap 103: Cale Yarborough's transmission problems ended his hopes of finishing the race.
 Lap 108: Jody Ridley managed to blow the engine of his vehicle.
 Lap 109: Buddy Baker's radiator stopped working properly.
 Lap 115: Caution due to debris; green flag racing resumed on lap 118.
 Lap 139: Tony Bettenhausen Jr.'s engine caused him to end his race weekend prematurely.
 Lap 161: Tim Richmond managed to lose the rear end of his vehicle.
 Finish: Bobby Allison was officially declared the winner of the event.

Standings after the race

References

Champion Spark Plug 400
Champion Spark Plug 400
NASCAR races at Michigan International Speedway